So Nice may refer to:

 So Nice (Soy beverage), a line of Soy-based beverages in Canada
"Summer Samba", also known as "So Nice", a 1966 bossa nova song
 "So Nice" (Scribe song), 2004
 "So Nice" (James Cottriall song), 2010
 So Nice (Johnny Mathis album), 1966
 So Nice (Houston Person album), 2011
 The So Nice Tour, concert tour by Carly Rae Jepsen